Michelle Hurst (born June 1, 1953) is an American actress. She played Miss Claudette Pelage in the first season of the streaming television series Orange Is the New Black.

Life and career
Hurst was born in Brooklyn, New York. She graduated from  Mount Holyoke College in 1974. She began her career in theatre, and in the 1990s began appearing in television and film. Hurst is known for her multiple roles in various Law & Order television shows. She co-starred in films like Airheads, Smoke, Stepmom and Sherrybaby.

Hurst starred as Miss Claudette Pelage in the first season of the Netflix comedy-drama series, Orange Is the New Black in 2013. This role earned Hurst, along with the main cast, a Satellite Award for Best Cast – Television Series. She left the show after a single season. On Christmas of 2013, she was seriously injured in a car accident. Hurst was placed in a 16-day coma so doctors could perform surgeries close to her spine.

In January 2015 Hurst appeared in the third series of the British television drama series Last Tango in Halifax.

Filmography

Film

Television

References

External links
 

Living people
20th-century American actresses
21st-century American actresses
Actresses from New York City
American film actresses
American television actresses
African-American actresses
People from Brooklyn
Mount Holyoke College alumni
1953 births
20th-century African-American women
20th-century African-American people
21st-century African-American women
21st-century African-American people